Jalan Utama Jengka 8, 9, 12 dan 13, Federal Route 1534, is the main federal roads in Bandar Pusat Jengka, Pahang, Malaysia.

At most sections, the Federal Route 1534 was built under the JKR R5 road standard, allowing maximum speed limit of up to 90 km/h.

List of junctions

Main road (north-south)

Batu Sawar - Jengka Barat (west-east)

Malaysian Federal Roads